CUG may refer to:

 Closed User Group, groups of GSM mobile telephone subscribers
 Genetic code for leucine
 China University of Geosciences (Beijing)
 China University of Geosciences (Wuhan)
 The Complete University Guide, a university league table compiler and student advice website
Central University of Gujarat, India